XXY is a greatest hits/rarities album by The Young Gods. It spans from 1985 to 2005.

Track listing

Disc 1
 "Secret" (Previously Unreleased) - 3:49
 "Lucidogen" (From Second Nature) - 4:10
 "Skinflowers (Video Edit) (From T.V. Sky)" - 4:04
 "Gasoline Man" (From T.V. Sky) - 4:22
 "Kissing the Sun" (From Only Heaven) - 3:42
 "Did You Miss Me?" (From The Young Gods) - 3:21
 "Envoyé!" (From the Envoyé! single) - 2:13
 "Fais La Mouette" (From The Young Gods) - 4:46
 "September Song" (From The Young Gods Play Kurt Weill) - 2:44
 "L’eau Rouge" (From L'Eau Rouge) - 4:22
 "L'Amourir" (From the L'Amourir single) - 4:17
 "Pas Mal" (From the L'Amourir single) - 2:46
 "Charlotte" (From L'Eau Rouge) - 2:04
 "Our House" (From T.V. Sky) - 2:51
 "Astronomic" (From Second Nature) - 5:45
 "Gardez Les Esprits" (From Only Heaven) - 1:07
 "Toi Du Monde (Edit)" (From Second Nature) - 5:16
 "Child In The Tree" (From Only Heaven) - 2:18
 "Donnez Les Esprits" (From Only Heaven) - 6:14
 "Alabama Song" (From The Young Gods Play Kurt Weill) - 5:50

Disc 2
 "Gasoline Man (Megadrive Mix)" - 6:47
 "Astronomic (Astronomix Edit)" - 6:07
 "Skinflowers (Brainforest Mix by F. Treichler)" - 7:27
 "In The Otherland (Lithos Mix by B. Trontin)" - 3:21
 "Child In The Tree (String Arrangement Demo by F. Rodi)" - 2:18
 "Drun (from Heaven Deconstruction by TYG - Album Version)" - 4:36
 "Supersonic (Dub Mix by F. Treichler)" - 6:00
 "Requiem Pour Un Con" (Serge Gainsbourg)- 4:58
 "Astronomic (Version 2 - Edit by V. Hänni)" - 6:33
 "The End (Live Cover by TYG)" - 3:17
 "Supersonic (Al Mix by A. Monod)" - 6:00
 "Kissing The Sun (Dub The Sun Mix by Mad Professor)" - 4:36
 "The Sound In Your Eyes (Naïve Mix by B. Trontin)" - 3:55
 "Astronomic (As_Float Mix - Edit by V. Hänni)" - 6:47
 "Iwasi (from Music For Artificial Clouds by TYG - Album Version)" - 5:25

References

The Young Gods albums
2005 greatest hits albums
Albums produced by Roli Mosimann
Albums produced by Franz Treichler